Astronomy Australia Limited (AAL) is an independent not-for-profit company whose members are all Australian universities and research organisations with a significant astronomy research capability.

Since its incorporation in 2007, AAL has coordinated the Australian astronomy response to, and managed the funding for, a number of national schemes and projects, including the Australian Government's investments in astronomy infrastructure through the National Collaborative Research Infrastructure Strategy (NCRIS). AAL-administered funding has enabled construction, instrumentation development, upgrades, maintenance and operations of astronomy facilities and projects. AAL also represents Australia's interests in a number of major international projects and partnerships while also managing the Anglo-Australian Telescope (AAT) Consortium.

The Chair of the AAL Board of Directors is Professor Rachel Webster AO FAA, who was recently appointed an Officer of the Order of Australia (AO) in the 2020 Australia Day Honours List.

Projects
Facilities and projects associated with AAL:
 European Southern Observatory
 Giant Magellan Telescope
 Australian Astronomical Optics
 Anglo-Australian Telescope
 Optical Data Centre
 Australia SKA Regional Centre
 Gravitational Wave Data Centre 
 ADACS / HPC 
 Square Kilometre Array
 Australian Square Kilometre Array Pathfinder (ASKAP)
 Murchison Widefield Array
 Cherenkov Telescope Array
 Vera C. Rubin Observatory (previously LSST)
 eROSITA

Membership
The current Members  are 
Australian National University,
Commonwealth Scientific and Industrial Research Organisation,
Curtin University,
Macquarie University,
Monash University,
Swinburne University of Technology,
University of Adelaide,
University of Melbourne,
University of New South Wales,
University of Queensland,
University of Southern Queensland,
University of Sydney,
University of Tasmania,
University of Western Australia,
Western Sydney University.

See also 
 List of astronomical societies
 List of telescopes of Australia

References

External links
Official website

Astronomy organizations
College and university associations and consortia in Australia
Astronomy in Australia
2007 establishments in Australia
Scientific organizations established in 2007